Oakland is an unincorporated community in Clinton County, Ohio, United States.

History
Oakland was laid out in 1806, and named for a grove of oak trees near the original town site. A post office called Oakland was established in 1839, and remained in operation until 1905.

Gallery

References

Unincorporated communities in Clinton County, Ohio
Unincorporated communities in Ohio